Ernestas Veliulis (born 22 August 1992) is a Lithuanian professional footballer who plays as a midfielder for Lithuanian A Lyga side FK Panevėžys. He has been capped by Lithuania once, playing for 28 minutes as a substitute in the 1-0 loss to Romania on 23 March 2016. He has also been capped for the Lithuanian under-17 and under-21 sides.

References 

Living people
Lithuanian footballers
Lithuania international footballers
A Lyga players
1992 births
FK Sūduva Marijampolė players
FK Daugava (2003) players
FK Klaipėdos Granitas players
FK Atlantas players
Association football midfielders